Salwāǧá  is the name of the eleventh month of the Afghan calendar. It occurs in the winter season, from January 20/21 to February 18/19. It has 30 days.

Salwāǧá corresponds with the tropical Zodiac sign Aquarius. Salwāǧá literally means "pail of water" in Pashto.

Observances 
 Chinese New Year - Movable (either on the first to third week of Salwāǧá)
 Super Bowl Sunday - Third or Fourth Sunday of Salwāǧá
 Washington's Birthday and President's Day - Last Monday of Salwāǧá
 Republic Day (India) and Australia Day - 6-7 Salwāǧá
 National Day of Sri Lanka - 16 Salwāǧá
 Valentine's Day - 25-26 Salwāǧá

References 

Pashto names for the months of the Solar Hijri calendar

ps:سلواغه(مياشت)